Norvellina is a genus of leafhoppers in the family Cicadellidae. There are at least 30 described species in Norvellina.

Species
These 39 species belong to the genus Norvellina:

 Norvellina acuspina Kramer & DeLong 1969 c g
 Norvellina adunca Kramer & DeLong 1969 c g
 Norvellina apachana Ball 1931 c g
 Norvellina bicolorata Ball, 1905 c g b
 Norvellina chenopodii (Osborn, 1923) c g b
 Norvellina cincta Kramer & DeLong 1969 c g
 Norvellina clarivida Van Duzee 1894 c g
 Norvellina columbiana (Ball, 1916) c g b
 Norvellina curvata Lindsay 1938 c g
 Norvellina denotata Kramer & DeLong 1969 c g
 Norvellina excavata Lindsay 1938 c g
 Norvellina flavida Lindsay 1938 c g
 Norvellina forficata Kramer & DeLong 1969 c g
 Norvellina glauca Lindsay 1938 c g
 Norvellina helenae Ball 1931 c g
 Norvellina mildredae Ball 1901 c g
 Norvellina musarrati Ghauri 1987 c g
 Norvellina nevada Ball 1916 c g
 Norvellina novica Medler, 1943 c g b
 Norvellina numerosa Lindsay 1938 c g
 Norvellina pannosa Ball 1902 c g
 Norvellina perelegantis Ball, 1901 c g b
 Norvellina pulchella Baker 1896 c g
 Norvellina pullata Ball, 1901 c g b
 Norvellina recepta Kramer & DeLong 1969 c g
 Norvellina rostrata Lindsay 1938 c g
 Norvellina rubida (Ball, 1916) c g b
 Norvellina saminai Ghauri 1987 c g
 Norvellina saucia Ball 1901 c g
 Norvellina scaber Osborn & Ball 1898 c g
 Norvellina scitula Ball 1901 c g
 Norvellina seminuda (Say, 1830) b
 Norvellina seminudus Say 1830 c g
 Norvellina snowi Ball 1907 c g
 Norvellina spatulata DeLong 1980 c g
 Norvellina texana Ball 1907 c g
 Norvellina uncata Kramer & DeLong 1969 c g
 Norvellina varia Lindsay 1938 c g
 Norvellina vermiculata Lindsay 1938 c g

Data sources: i = ITIS, c = Catalogue of Life, g = GBIF, b = Bugguide.net

References

Further reading

External links

 

Cicadellidae genera
Athysanini